London Buses route 28 is a Transport for London contracted bus route in London, England. Running between Southside Wandsworth and Kensal Rise station, it is operated by London Transit.

History

In 1988, Gold Arrow routes 28 and 31 were introduced, operated by CentreWest. On 4 March 1989, route 28 was converted to minibus operation with AEC Routemasters replaced by 28-seat Alexander bodied Mercedes-Benz midibuses leading to severe overcrowding and poor reliability.

In June 2013, route 28 was included in the sale of First London's Atlas Road garage to Tower Transit.

On 1 May 2021, Route 28 was passed on to London United from Wandsworth and Stamford Brook Garages.

Current route
Route 28 operates via these primary locations:
Southside Wandsworth
Wandsworth Town station 
Wandsworth Bridge
Fulham Broadway station 
West Kensington station 
Kensington Olympia station   
Hammersmith Road
Kensington High Street
High Street Kensington station 
Kensington Palace North
Notting Hill Gate station 
Portobello Market
Westbourne Park station 
Harrow Road Prince of Wales Hotel
Kensal Rise station

References

External links

Timetable

Bus routes in London
Transport in the London Borough of Brent
Transport in the London Borough of Hammersmith and Fulham
Transport in the Royal Borough of Kensington and Chelsea
Transport in the London Borough of Wandsworth